Walk with Me is the second extended play (EP) by Nigerian-American recording artist Rotimi. The EP was released on May 24, 2019, by FrontRo Music Group and Empire Distribution.

Track listing

Charts

References

2019 EPs
Empire Distribution EPs